Uprising is a three-part documentary series made for the BBC by Steve McQueen and James Rogan. The series is about the tragedy and aftermath of events in 1981 which it argues would go on to define race relations in the United Kingdom for a generation. In May 2022, Uprising won a television BAFTA for Factual Series.

Episodes

Broadcast
The series is broadcast in the United Kingdom across three consecutive days on BBC One at 9pm from 20 July 2021.

Reception
The Financial Times called it a "powerful oral history of a disaster whose repercussions have echoed down to Grenfell and beyond."  Uprising won the 2022 television BAFTA in the Factual Series category.

References

2020s British documentary television series
2021 British television series debuts
2021 British television series endings
BBC television documentaries about history during the 20th Century